Alden Todd (January 12, 1918 – March 8, 2006) was an author, among whose works included Finding Facts Fast, a popular guide on library research, released in several editions (from 1972 to 1992) prior to the emergence of the World Wide Web. In 1965, Alden Todd won a Silver Gavel Award from the American Bar Association, for his book Justice on Trial: The Case of Louis D. Brandeis.

Published works 
 Minding the Money: A Practical Guide for Volunteer Treasurers, iUniverse, 2003, 
 Finding Facts Fast, first edition: 1972; latest edition: Ten Speed Press, 1992, 160 pages, 
 Richard Montgomery: Rebel of 1775, D. McKay Co., 1967
 A Spark Lighted in Portland: The Record of the National Board of Fire Underwriters, McGraw-Hill, 1966
 Justice on Trial: The Case of Louis D. Brandeis, McGraw-Hill, 1964, 
 Abandoned: The Story of the Greely Arctic Expedition 1881-1884, McGraw-Hill, 1961,

Notes

External links 
  Alden Todd, by Joe Holley, Washington Post, March 21, 2006 – Biographical article
 Article in Encyclopedia.com

1918 births
2006 deaths
American male non-fiction writers